Nelson South is an inner suburb of Nelson, New Zealand. It lies to the southwest of Nelson city centre, between it and Bishopdale, close to the foot of The Grampians. The main inland route to Stoke, New Zealand, Waimea Road, is Nelson South's main road.

The suburb includes both Nelson Hospital and Nelson College.

It also has six public reserves: Fairfield Park, the Melrose Gardens, Ronaki Reserve, Waimea North Reserve, Wellington Reserve and Wigzell Park.

Demographics

Rutherford had a population of 2,583 at the 2018 New Zealand census, an increase of 93 people (3.7%) since the 2013 census, and an increase of 108 people (4.4%) since the 2006 census. There were 1,008 households. There were 1,227 males and 1,356 females, giving a sex ratio of 0.9 males per female. The median age was 42.2 years (compared with 37.4 years nationally), with 471 people (18.2%) aged under 15 years, 498 (19.3%) aged 15 to 29, 1,200 (46.5%) aged 30 to 64, and 414 (16.0%) aged 65 or older.

Ethnicities were 85.4% European/Pākehā, 8.7% Māori, 2.3% Pacific peoples, 10.5% Asian, and 1.6% other ethnicities (totals add to more than 100% since people could identify with multiple ethnicities).

The proportion of people born overseas was 32.1%, compared with 27.1% nationally.

Although some people objected to giving their religion, 59.7% had no religion, 27.2% were Christian, 2.7% were Hindu, 0.1% were Muslim, 1.9% were Buddhist and 2.9% had other religions.

Of those at least 15 years old, 783 (37.1%) people had a bachelor or higher degree, and 210 (9.9%) people had no formal qualifications. The median income was $33,300, compared with $31,800 nationally. The employment status of those at least 15 was that 996 (47.2%) people were employed full-time, 450 (21.3%) were part-time, and 63 (3.0%) were unemployed.

Education

Nelson College campus

Nelson College Preparatory School is a private preparatory school for Year 7 to 8 boys, located on the Nelson College Campus.

Other schools

References

Suburbs of Nelson, New Zealand
Populated places in the Nelson Region